The Cidacos River is a tributary of the Ebro.  Its source is Los Campos, in Soria, and it flows for 77 km (48 mi) until its reaches the Ebro at Calahorra (La Rioja).

It flows through or past various towns like Villar del Río, Yanguas, Enciso, Peroblasco, Arnedillo, Santa Eulalia Somera, and Bajera, Herce, Arnedo, Quel, Autol, and Calahorra.  The river is used for irrigation purposes and is often dried up near Calahorra.

See also 
 List of rivers of Spain

Rivers of Spain
Rivers of La Rioja (Spain)
Rivers of Castile and León